Adam Cherimovich Natkho (born 14 February 1959) is a Russian professional football coach and former player.

Personal life 
Adam is a Circassian by nationality. He is related to Bibras Natkho and is the father of Amir Natkho.

References

External links 
 

1959 births
People from Takhtamukaysky District
Circassian people of Russia
Living people
Soviet footballers
Russian footballers
Association football utility players
Association football defenders
FC Kuban Krasnodar players
Soviet Top League players
Russian football managers
Russian expatriate football managers
Expatriate football managers in Israel
Sportspeople from Adygea